Kicking a Couple Around is an EP by Bill Callahan (also known as Smog). It was released on Drag City in April 1996 and re-released in Europe on Domino in 2001. "Your New Friend" was recorded during a 1995 John Peel radio session. "Back in School," "I Break Horses," and "The Orange Glow of a Stranger's Living Room" were recorded by Steve Albini.

In an interview, Callahan said that "I Break Horses" was written "to help a friend try to understand how a guy she had a one-night stand with could possibly not return her phone calls the next day or ever again."

Critical reception
Trouser Press praised “The Orange Glow of a Stranger’s Living Room,” writing that it "lets some lovely picking and piano pierce the warm gloom of [Smog's] abiding displacement." The Washington Post called the EP "four delicate, downbeat songs that have a trad-country mournfulness."

Track listing
 "Your New Friend" – 6:51
 "Back in School" – 4:40
 "I Break Horses" – 4:44
 "The Orange Glow of a Stranger's Living Room" – 3:26

References

1996 EPs
Bill Callahan (musician) EPs
albums produced by Steve Albini
Drag City (record label) EPs
Domino Recording Company EPs